Leonardo Manzella (born March 1, 1947), best known as Leonard Mann, is an American social worker, writer, and former actor. He played numerous leading roles in Italian genre films between 1969 and 1989, especially in Spaghetti westerns and poliziotteschi.  

He was discovered by producer Manolo Bolognini as he was walking along Via Veneto and Bolognini, impressed by his face that reminded him of Franco Nero and Terence Hill, immediately put him on the screen, launching his career with the leading role of Sebastian in The Forgotten Pistolero. 

Since retiring from showbusiness in 1989, he has worked as a social worker and therapist for the Los Angeles Unified School District in addition to a private practice San Luis Obispo. A vocal advocate of prison reform, he has written and produced a play, Cages, about his experiences working with inmates.

Selected filmography 
 The Forgotten Pistolero (1969)
 Chuck Moll (1970)
 Vengeance Is a Dish Served Cold (1971)
 Amore amaro (1974)
 The Body (1974)
 Rudeness (1975)
 The Left Hand of the Law (1976)
 Weapons of Death (1977)
 Wifemistress (1977)
 The Criminals Attack. The Police Respond. (1977)
 Death Steps in the Dark (1977)
 The Perfect Crime (1978)
 The Humanoid (1979)
 Night School (1981)
 Copkiller (1983)
 Unfaithfully Yours (1984)
 Cut and Run (1985)
 Flowers in the Attic (1987)
 Silent Night, Deadly Night 3: Better Watch Out! (1989)

References

External links 
 

American male film actors
1947 births
Living people

American people of Italian descent
Actors from New York (state)
American expatriates in Italy